Blessthefall (stylized as blessthefall or BLESSTHEFALL prior to 2013) was an American metalcore band from Phoenix, Arizona, signed to Rise Records. The band was founded in 2004 by guitarist Mike Frisby, drummer Matt Traynor, and bassist and vocalist Jared Warth. Their debut studio album, His Last Walk, with original vocalist Craig Mabbitt, was released April 10, 2007. Their second studio album, Witness, with second vocalist Beau Bokan, was released October 6, 2009. Their third studio album, Awakening, was released on October 4, 2011. Their fourth studio album, Hollow Bodies, was released on August 20, 2013. To Those Left Behind is the band's fifth studio album, released on September 18, 2015. Their sixth and final studio album, Hard Feelings, was released on March 23, 2018. Following Traynor's departure, Warth became the band's only remaining original member before they disbanded in 2022.

History

Formation, line-up changes and His Last Walk (2004–2007)

Blessthefall grew out of the high school practice sessions of rhythm guitarist Mike Frisby, lead guitarist Miles Bergsma, drummer Matt Traynor, bassist and vocalist Jared Warth, keyboardist and vocalist Andrew Barr and later, vocalist Craig Mabbitt. Mabbitt's arrival resulted in Barr moving to strictly keyboards. Barr then departed in early 2005, with Warth picking up the keyboards when necessary. After founding member Miles Bergsma left to attend college at the Berklee College of Music in Boston, they released a three-track EP and newcomer Eric Lambert (Bergmas's replacement) became the lead guitarist to form their first solid line-up. Phoenix-area gigs with Greeley Estates and an openly religious orientation got the band local press and a deal with Warner subsidiary, Science Records. The band then toured with Alesana and Norma Jean across the United States and Canada. Their debut album, His Last Walk, was released on April 10, 2007, to mixed reviews. It peaked at No. 32 on the U.S. Billboard Heatseekers chart. The album sold over 65,000 copies, and its singles sold over 100,000 copies.

Blessthefall toured with Escape the Fate, LoveHateHero, Before Their Eyes, and Dance Gavin Dance on the Black on Black tour during September and October 2007. They were also part of the Underground Operations Tour and Loathing Tour 2007, opening for Protest the Hero and All That Remains, along with fellow opening bands, Threat Signal and the Holly Springs Disaster. They were a part of From First to Last's fall headlining tour, starting November 1 with A Skylit Drive and Vanna. The band also completed the entire 2007 Warped Tour circuit nationwide.

Mabbitt's departure and Bokan's induction (2007–2008)
While on their first European tour (with Silverstein) in late 2007, Craig Mabbitt left the band during the United Kingdom portion to spend more time with his daughter, whose childhood he felt he was missing out on. For the remainder of the tour, Jared Warth filled in for vocals while playing keyboards. When Mabbitt later attempted to return to Blessthefall, the band members decided not to let him back in, preferring to move on without him. On December 15, 2007, Blessthefall posted a blog on their MySpace page announcing their parting ways with Mabbitt, while Mabbitt posted a bulletin on his personal MySpace page stating his willingness to return to the band. Despite the departure, Mabbitt has remained great friends with the band.

Craig Mabbitt stated that the day after he finished recording his first album with Escape the Fate, This War Is Ours, he got a phone call from Blessthefall's management asking him to return to the band, but he refused. Mabbitt felt there was too much bad blood with their management. He also felt the band knew he had just finished a new album and that it was just bad timing, especially as he had begged to be back in for the previous eight months.

The final song the band recorded and released with Mabbitt, called "I Wouldn't Quit If Everyone Quit", was released on the reissue of His Last Walk. 

Shortly after this, on September 26, 2008, the band announced that they had made Beau Bokan the new lead singer and keyboardist. Bokan joined the band after leaving Take the Crown, a group who released an EP and a full-length album but broke up due to the departures of James Campbell and Tony Gonzalez, lack of management, and financial burdens.

Witness (2009–2010)

In May 2009, after their tour with Silverstein, Norma Jean, and Before Their Eyes, the band headed into the studio to record their second album, Witness. On May 13 the band signed to Fearless Records and worked on the album with producer Elvis Baskette.

On June 3, the band announced via MySpace that they were officially finished with the recording of their new album and that it was to be released in the autumn. They also had a mid-year tour with August Burns Red and Enter Shikari. In July, Blessthefall released a song clip on their MySpace page titled "God Wears Gucci", released on iTunes for download on August 11, 2009. In September 2009, the band uploaded another track on their MySpace page titled "What's Left of Me". Witness was released on October 6, 2009.

In June 2010, Blessthefall toured New Zealand in support of Saosin, and in Australia in support of Story of the Year and Saosin. Blessthefall played across Auckland, Sydney, Melbourne, Brisbane and Adelaide.

After the release of Witness, the band co-headlined the Atticus Fall Tour with Finch, Drop Dead, Gorgeous, and Vanna from October 10, 2009, through to November 19. Other bands on the tour included Of Mice & Men and Let's Get It.

In October 2009, the band announced on YouTube that they were working on a music video for "What's Left of Me", which was released December 14, 2009, on MySpace Metal.

In 2009, the band took home the Best Noise/Screamo Band Award, as well as the Best Hardcore Band Award at the 2009 Arizona Ska Punk Awards. One year later, the band was once again awarded the Best Hardcore Band Award at the 2010 awards ceremony.

In April 2010, the band was featured on the Punk Goes Classic Rock album, covering "Dream On" by Aerosmith.

Their song "To Hell and Back", released on Witness, was released on the soundtrack to Ubisoft's Tom Clancy's Splinter Cell: Conviction. The game trailer was released on April 9, 2010.

Frisby's departure and Awakening (2011–2012)

On February 15, 2011, the band announced that Mike Frisby had left the band to pursue another path leaving bassist and vocalist Jared Warth and drummer Matt Traynor the remaining two founding members of the band. Elliott Gruenberg, formerly of Before Their Eyes, Legacy, and Settle the Sky, would be permanently on guitar. Bokan confirmed that Blessthefall would not play at Warped Tour 2011, but rather would be recording their third full-length album, which began in Orlando, Florida on May 17, 2011. Michael "Elvis" Baskette, who produced their previous album, also produced this effort. The band had hoped to feature guest vocalists including Ronnie Radke of Falling in Reverse (previously of Escape the Fate) and Tim Lambesis of As I Lay Dying, but it was later confirmed that there would be no guest vocals.

Blessthefall joined Emmure, Alesana, Motionless in White and other bands on the All Stars Tour. The band headlined the Fearless Friends tour with The Word Alive, Motionless in White, Tonight Alive, and Chunk! No Captain Chunk!. They released the official video of "Promised Ones" on November 11, 2011, which starts with the intro song of the album titled Awakening. According to a video interview with Lambert and Bokan, Blessthefall planned on entering the studio in February to record an EP with Tim Lambesis of As I Lay Dying. Later Matt Traynor confirmed that this was not true. Due to time restraints they had to put off the recording of the EP until after Warped Tour. Plans for this EP have since been scrapped according to guitarist Eric Lambert in an interview with Bryan Stars.

Hollow Bodies (2012–2014)

On October 4, 2012, the band confirmed that they were writing a fourth album. Recording of this album started on April 19, 2013 and finished on May 21, 2013. Hollow Bodies was subsequently released on August 20, 2013, reaching No. 15 on the Billboard 200 album charts with 21,888 copies sold in its first week. The entire album was actually streamed through Billboard's website one week before the actual release. Joey Sturgis produced the album.

Three singles were released, including "You Wear a Crown But You're No King", "Déjà Vu" and "See You on the Outside".

The band toured in the Warped Tour 2013, alongside Motion City Soundtrack, Big D and the Kids Table, Five Knives, Itch, Echosmith and Goldhouse.

On January 17, 2014, the band announced their upcoming North American tour to promote Hollow Bodies.

On December 10, 2014, the band was announced as part of Warped Tour 2015.

To Those Left Behind, Hard Feelings and disbandment (2015–2022) 
On May 1, 2015, the band announced they were working on a new album. On June 11, 2015, they announced that it would be titled To Those Left Behind. It was released on September 18, 2015. On July 14, the band released the official audio for the song "Up in Flames" from the album. On August 4, the band announced the release date of their second single, "Walk on Water", which was released on August 7 along with the online preorders.

On September 28, 2016, the band announced they were touring with Crown the Empire, New Years Day, and Too Close to Touch. The band was announced on March 22, 2017, to be playing on Warped Tour 2017. 

On January 26, 2018, they announced they have signed a new record deal with Rise Records. Their sixth studio album, Hard Feelings, was released through Rise Records, on March 23.

On August 17, 2018, drummer Matt Traynor announced he will be departing from the band, citing his family being the main reason, after their headlining Hard Feelings tour with The Word Alive.

After a ten year anniversary tour for Witness in the latter half of 2019, the band ceased to update their social media accounts, with the last tweet being posted on January 9, 2020. In December 2022, the four remaining members removed the band from their personal social media profiles, implying the band had come to a quiet end.

Musical style
The band's style has been described as metalcore, post-hardcore, Christian metal (although frontman Beau Bokan has stated that they don't want to be considered a Christian band), and screamo.

Members

Final line-up
  
 Jared Warth – unclean vocals (2004–2022); bass (2004–2007, 2008–2022); clean vocals (2004); keyboards (2005–2008)
 Eric Lambert – lead guitar (2005–2022); backing vocals (2008–2022); clean vocals (2007–2008)
 Beau Bokan – clean vocals, keyboards (2008–2022)
 Elliott Gruenberg – rhythm guitar (2011–2022); backing vocals (2013–2022)

Former
 Andrew Barr – keyboards (2004–2005); unclean vocals (2004)
 Miles Bergsma – lead guitar (2004–2005)
 Craig Mabbitt  – lead vocals (2004–2007)
 Mike Frisby – rhythm guitar (2004–2011)
 Matt Traynor – drums, percussion (2004–2018)

Former touring
 Aiden Louis – bass (2007–2008)
 Conor White – drums, percussion (2019)

Timeline

Discography

Studio albums
 His Last Walk (2007)
 Witness (2009)
 Awakening (2011)
 Hollow Bodies (2013)
 To Those Left Behind (2015)
 Hard Feelings (2018)

References

Metalcore musical groups from Arizona
American post-hardcore musical groups
Musical groups established in 2004
Musical groups disestablished in 2022
Musical groups from Phoenix, Arizona
Musical quintets
Fearless Records artists
American screamo musical groups
Ferret Music artists
American Christian metal musical groups
2004 establishments in Arizona
2022 disestablishments in Arizona